David Neville may refer to:
David Neville (sprinter) (born 1984), American 400m runner
David Neville (ice hockey) (1908–1991), Canadian ice hockey player